Heimborn is an Ortsgemeinde – a community belonging to a Verbandsgemeinde – in the Westerwaldkreis in Rhineland-Palatinate, Germany. The agriculturally structured residential community belongs to the Verbandsgemeinde of Hachenburg, a kind of collective municipality. Its seat is in the like-named town.

Geography

Location
The community lies in the Westerwald between Limburg and Siegen, at the forks of the Nister in the middle of the Kroppach Switzerland.

Constituent communities
Heimborn's Ortsteile are Heimborn and Ehrlich.

History
In 1346, Heimborn had its first documentary mention.

Politics

The municipal council is made up of 6 council members who were elected in a majority vote in a municipal election on 7 June 2009.

Economy and infrastructure

South of the community runs Bundesstraße 414, leading from Hohenroth to Hachenburg. The nearest Autobahn interchanges are Siegen, Wilnsdorf and Herborn on the A 45 (Dortmund–Gießen), some 25 km away. The nearest InterCityExpress stop is the railway station at Montabaur on the Cologne-Frankfurt high-speed rail line.

References

External links
  Heimborn in the collective municipality’s Web pages 

Municipalities in Rhineland-Palatinate
Westerwaldkreis
Kroppach Switzerland